Enteromius amanpoae is a species of cyprinid fish endemic to the Democratic Republic of the Congo where it is found in the Amanpoa River and the Uele River.  This species reaches a length of  TL.

References

Enteromius
Taxa named by Jacques G. Lambert 
Fish described in 1961
Endemic fauna of the Democratic Republic of the Congo